Highland is an unincorporated community in Fillmore County, in the U.S. state of Minnesota.

History
A post office was established in Highland in 1857, and remained in operation until it was discontinued in 1902. The community was named for its lofty elevation.

References

Unincorporated communities in Fillmore County, Minnesota
1857 establishments in Minnesota Territory
Populated places established in 1857
Unincorporated communities in Minnesota